Świdwin  is a town in West Pomeranian Voivodeship of northwestern Poland. In 2018 the town had a population of 15,725.

History

In the 12th century there was a gród on the trade route from the coastal city of Kołobrzeg to Greater Poland. In the 13th century the settlement belonged to the Duchy of Pomerania under the Griffin duke Barnim I. In 1248 the duke ceded the area to the Bishop of Cammin, who shortly afterwards sold it to the Ascanian margraves of Brandenburg. Schivelbein was incorporated as the northeastern outpost of the Neumark region. It was granted town rights by 1296. From 1373 it was part of the Lands of the Bohemian (Czech) Crown as one of its northernmost towns, in 1384 it was passed to the State of the Teutonic Order, and in 1455 to Brandenburg, which possession it remained until the dissolution of the Holy Roman Empire in 1806. In 1477 a Carthusian monastery was established, which was secularized in 1539. Brewing developed at that time. In 1550, around 30% of the population died in an epidemic. In the 17th century the town suffered as a result of two fires and the Thirty Years' War. In 1816 it became part of the Prussian province of Pomerania.

The Battle of Świdwin took place south of the town during 6–7 March 1945, in which a German SS corps was encircled and destroyed by two Soviet and one Polish armies. After the town was captured, a Soviet general was killed by a member of the Hitler Youth. The reprisals that followed saw the men shot, and the women and girls raped by Soviet troops. 

After World War II Schivelbein with Farther Pomerania became part of the Republic of Poland and its name changed to Świbowina, which was officially renamed to Świdwin in 1946. The town's populace that had stayed or had fled their home and returned was expelled. The town's first post-war mayor was Jan Górski, and Polish schools, institutions and factories were established, however war damage was removed until the 1950s.

Population
1960: 10,000 inhabitants
1970: 12,600 inhabitants
1975: 13,500 inhabitants
1980: 14,000 inhabitants
2004: 17,000 inhabitants
2005: 16,240 inhabitants
2008: 15,486 inhabitants
2009: 15,621 inhabitants
2010: 15,503 inhabitants
2018: 15,725 inhabitants

Sights

The main historic landmarks of Świdwin are the Gothic-Baroque castle, the Gothic Stone Gate (Brama Kamienna) and the Gothic church of Our Lady of Perpetual Help from the 14th century.

Świdwin's airport 
Civilians are not permitted to enter, but this airport is often used for government's aircraft. The runway is  length and  width.

Notable residents
 Rudolf Virchow (1821–1902), German physician, anthropologist, pathologist, prehistorian, biologist, writer, editor, and politician
 Otto Georg Bogislaf von Glasenapp (1853–1928), Vice president of the Reichsbank
 Johannes Poeppel (1921–2007), general in the German Bundeswehr
 Władysław Blin (born 1954), Roman Catholic bishop
 Grzegorz Halama (born 1970), Polish parodist and cabaret actor.

International relations

Twin towns — sister cities
Świdwin is twinned with:
 Sanitz, Germany

References
 Werwolf!: The History of the National Socialist Guerrilla Movement, 1944-1946, Perry Biddiscombe, Toronto: University of Toronto Press, 1998. .
 Boje Polskie 1939-1945, Krzysztof Komorowski et al., Warszawa: Bellona, 2009. .

External links
 Municipal website 
 History of town 
 History photo

Notes

Cities and towns in West Pomeranian Voivodeship
Świdwin County